Mahadewa (311) is a constituency of the Uttar Pradesh Legislative Assembly in the Basti district of Uttar Pradesh,  India.

Mahadewa is one of five assembly constituencies in the Basti Lok Sabha constituency. Since 2008, this assembly constituency is numbered 311 amongst 403 constituencies.

Members of Legislative Assembly (MLAs)

Election results

2022

2017
Bharatiya Janta Party candidate Ravi Kumar Sonkar won in last Assembly election of 2017 Uttar Pradesh Legislative Elections defeating Bahujan Samaj Party candidate Doodhram by a margin of 25,884 votes.

16th Vidhan Sabha: 2012 General Elections

References

External links
 

Assembly constituencies of Uttar Pradesh
Basti district